Germany was represented by Katja Ebstein, with the song "Theater", at the 1980 Eurovision Song Contest, which took place on 19 April in The Hague. "Theater" was the winner of the German national final, held on 20 March. This was Ebstein's third Eurovision appearance; she had previously represented Germany in 1970 and 1971, finishing third on both occasions.

Before Eurovision

Ein Lied für Den Haag

The final was held at the Bayerischer Rundfunk TV studios in Munich, hosted by Carolin Reiber and Thomas Gottschalk. 12 songs took part and the winner was chosen by a panel of approximately 1,000 people who had been selected as providing a representative cross-section of the German public.

At Eurovision 
On the night of the final Ebstein performed 12th in the running order, following Norway and preceding the United Kingdom. The performance was memorable, featuring four mime artists, and at the close of voting "Theater" had received 128 points, placing Germany second of the 19 entries. Only Greece and Norway failed to award the song any points at all. The German jury awarded its 12 points to contest winners Ireland.

The 1980 result gave Ebstein the distinction of being the only Eurovision performer to date to have finished in the top 3 on three occasions.

Voting

References

1980
Countries in the Eurovision Song Contest 1980
Eurovision